The crested blenny (Parablennius laticlavius) is a species of combtooth blenny found off New South Wales, Australia, New Zealand and the Kermadec Islands to depths of between .  This species reaches a length of  TL.

References

External links
 
 Ayling, Tony & Geoffrey Cox (1982). Collins Guide to the Sea Fishes of New Zealand. Auckland, New Zealand: William Collins Publishers Ltd. 

crested blenny
Fauna of New South Wales
Fauna of the Kermadec Islands
Marine fish of New Zealand
crested blenny